Coeliades sejuncta, the coast policeman or ochreous-banded policeman, is a butterfly in the family Hesperiidae. It is found along the coast of Kenya and in Tanzania (from the coast inland to Amani and also in the Kigoma district), southern Malawi, Zambia and Zimbabwe. Its habitat consists of forests, coastal forests, riverine forests, and dense bush.

Adults are attracted to flowers, including Maerua species

The larvae feed on Acridocarpus zanzibaricum.

References

Butterflies described in 1891
Coeliadinae
Butterflies of Africa